
Year 96 BC was a year of the pre-Julian Roman calendar. At the time it was known as the Year of the Consulship of Ahenobarbus and Longinus (or, less frequently, year 658 Ab urbe condita). The denomination 96 BC for this year has been used since the early medieval period, when the Anno Domini calendar era became the prevalent method in Europe for naming years.

Events 
 By place 

 Roman Republic 
 Consuls: Gaius Cassius Longinus and Gnaeus Domitius Ahenobarbus
 Cyrene is left to the people of the Roman Republic by its ruler Ptolemy Apion.

 Greece 
 Seleucus VI Epiphanes becomes king of the Seleucid Empire following the death of his father Antiochus VIII Grypus, and defeating in battle Antiochus IX Cyzicenus.

 Asia 
 Start of the Taishi era in the Han Dynasty.

Births 
Galeria Copiola, Roman dancer d. 9 AD

Deaths 
 Antiochus VIII Grypus, king of the Seleucid Empire 
 Antiochus IX Cyzicenus, king of the Seleucid Empire
 Gongsun Ao, Chinese general of the Han Dynasty
 Ptolemy Apion, king of Cyrenaica (modern Libya)

References